Prideaux may refer to:

 One of several persons with the surname Prideaux; see Prideaux (surname)
 Prideaux Castle, an Iron Age hillfort near St Blazey, Cornwall, England, United Kingdom
 Prideaux Place, a country house near Padstow, Cornwall, England, United Kingdom 
 William Prideaux Courtney (1845–1913), English biographer